is one of the eight major titles in professional shogi. The word means "the king's rank" (王 ō 'king' + 位 i 'rank, position').

Background
The annual tournament started in 1960 sponsored by a group of local newspapers which has consisted of Shimbun Sansha Rengō (Three-Newspaper Association). With the addition of Ōi, there were four major shogi titles along with Meijin, Ninth Dan (Ryūō), and Ōshō.

Format
The challenger for the title is determined by three-step preliminary round that comprises 1st heat, league competition and final playoff. Top eight players in 1st heat and top four players of previous year are divided into two six-player leagues. Top one of each league advances to final playoff, and the winner of one-game match becomes the challenger.

The player that wins four games out of seven first in the championship will become the new Ōi title holder. Each championship games assign players a six-hour playtime during two days.

Lifetime Ōi 

 is the title awarded to a player who won the championship five times in a row or ten times in total. Active players may qualify for this title, but it is only officially awarded upon their retirement or death.

Only three professionals have qualified for the Lifetime Oi. They are as follows:
 Yasuharu Ōyama (deceased)
 Makoto Nakahara (retired)
 Yoshiharu Habu (active)

Winners

Records
 Most titles overall: Yoshiharu Habu, 18
 Most consecutive titles: Yasuharu Ōyama, 12 (1960-1971)

Notes

References

External links 
 Japan Shogi Association, Tournament information: Oi Tournament (in Japanese)

Shogi tournaments